Red TV is a Colombian local religious television channel, based in Bogotá. It is owned by the Iglesia Manantial de Vida Eterna, a Christian congregation founded by pastor Eduardo Cañas Estrada. The broadcasting licence was granted by the National Television Commission on 19 July 2005. Broadcasts started December 2006.

References

External links 
 Official site
 Iglesia Manantial de Vida Eterna

Television networks in Colombia
Television channels and stations established in 2006
Evangelical television networks
Spanish-language television stations
Mass media in Bogotá